Ombra Racing is an auto racing team based in Italy.

Current series results

Porsche Supercup

† Guest drivers,which were ineligible to score points.

Former series results

Italian Formula 3

3000 Pro Series/International Formula Master

German Formula 3

† Shared results with other teams

Auto GP

† Shared results with other teams

External links

References

Italian auto racing teams
Formula 3 Euro Series teams
International GT Open teams
International Formula 3000 teams
International Formula Masters teams
British Formula Three teams
German Formula 3 teams
Auto GP teams
Porsche Supercup teams
Italian Formula 3 teams
Blancpain Endurance Series teams
European Le Mans Series teams
Auto racing teams established in 1994